Enari Tuala (born 19 October 1998) is an Australian professional rugby league footballer who plays as a er or  for the Newcastle Knights in the NRL. 

He previously played for the North Queensland Cowboys in the National Rugby League, and has represented the Prime Minister's XIII.

Background
Tuala was born in Cairns, Queensland, Australia, and is of Samoan descent.

He played his junior rugby league for the Edmonton Storm, before being signed by the North Queensland Cowboys.

Playing career

Early career
After being signed by the North Queensland Cowboys, Tuala moved to Townsville, where he attended Kirwan State High School and played for the Townsville Stingers' Cyril Connell and Mal Meninga Cup sides. In 2014, Tuala represented the Queensland under-16 team. In 2015, Tuala scored a hat trick in the Stingers' Mal Meninga Cup Grand Final victory and was selected for the Queensland under-18 team. Later that year, he scored twice in Kirwan's ARL Schoolboy Cup final victory over Patrician Brothers' College, Blacktown. In 2016, Tuala played for North Queensland's NYC side, scoring 12 tries in 15 games. He was again selected for the Queensland under-18 side but was later ruled out through injury.

2017
In early 2017, Tuala trained during the pre-season with North Queensland's first grade squad. He played in their first NRL trial against the Sydney Roosters, scoring a try in the 11-10 win.

In May, Tuala played for the Junior Kangaroos against the Junior Kiwis, before re-signing with the North Queensland club on a two-year contract until the end of 2019. In round 24 of the 2017 NRL season, he made his NRL debut for the Cowboys against the Cronulla-Sutherland Sharks.

2018
In Round 13 of the 2018 NRL season against Manly Warringah Sea Eagles, Tuala scored his first NRL try in North Queensland's 26-12 win at Brookvale Oval.

On October 6, Tuala made his senior representative debut for the Prime Minister's XIII, coming off the bench and assisting a try in the side's 34–18 win over the PNG Prime Minister's XIII. A week later, on 13 October, he scored a double in the Junior Kangaroos 40–24 win over the Junior Kiwis.

2019
Tuala played just seven NRL games for North Queensland in 2019. He spent the majority of the season playing for the Northern Pride in the Queensland Cup.

On 13 September, it was announced that he would not be re-signed by the North Queensland club.

2020
Tuala joined the Newcastle Knights on a one-year contract ahead of the 2020 season.

Tuala played 20 games for Newcastle in the 2020 NRL season and scored 11 tries. He played in Newcastle's first finals game since 2013 which was a 46-20 loss against South Sydney in the elimination final.

2021
In round 20 of the 2021 NRL season, Tuala scored a hat-trick for Newcastle in a 34-24 victory over Canberra.

In round 22, he scored two tries for Newcastle in a 16-14 victory over Cronulla-Sutherland.

In week one of the 2021 Finals Series, Tuala scored a hat-trick for Newcastle in their 20-28 loss against Parramatta in the elimination final.

2022
In round 21 of the 2022 NRL season, Tuala scored two tries for Newcastle in a 14-10 victory over fellow cellar dwellers the Wests Tigers.

On 16 August, it was announced that Tuala had been stood down from the Newcastle club for not meeting team standards. Tuala had played in the club's loss against Brisbane in round 22 but failed to make the team bus which was heading to the airport the next morning.

Statistics

NRL
 Statistics are correct to the end of the 2019 season

References

External links
Newcastle Knights profile
North Queensland Cowboys profile
NRL profile

1998 births
Living people
Australian rugby league players
Australian sportspeople of Samoan descent
North Queensland Cowboys players
Newcastle Knights players
Northern Pride RLFC players
Prime Minister's XIII players
Junior Kangaroos players
Rugby league centres
Rugby league wingers
Rugby league players from Cairns